LPY may refer to:

Le Puy – Loudes Airport, France, IATA airport code
Liverpool South Parkway railway station, Liverpool, National Rail station code
Lalu Prasad Yadav, Indian politician